Tripylella mexicana is a species of nematodes, first found in Mexico. It can be distinguished by its rather short body (averaging  in length); having a short pharynx; its short tail; possession of an excretory pore as well as setae distributed throughout its body; having body pores; its striated cuticle carrying several anastomoses; non-protruding vulval lips, as well as other characteristics.

References 

Enoplia